Events in the year 1980 in the Republic of India.

Incumbents
 President of India – Neelam Sanjiva Reddy
 Prime Minister of India – Charan Singh until 14 January, then Indira Gandhi again became the prime minister of India.
 Chief Justice of India – Yeshwant Vishnu Chandrachud

Governors
 Andhra Pradesh – K. C. Abraham 
 Assam – L. P. Singh 
 Bihar – Akhlaqur Rahman Kidwai 
 Gujarat – Sharda Mukherjee 
 Haryana – Surjit Singh Sandhawalia (until 27 February), Ganpatrao Devji Tapase (starting 27 February)
 Himachal Pradesh – Amin ud-din Ahmad Khan 
 Jammu and Kashmir – L. K. Jha 
 Karnataka – Govind Narain 
 Kerala – Jothi Venkatachalam 
 Madhya Pradesh – C. M. Poonacha (until 30 April), B. D. Sharma (starting 30 April)
 Maharashtra – Sri Sadiq Ali (until 3 November), O. P. Mehra (starting 3 November)
 Manipur – L.P. Singh 
 Meghalaya – L.P. Singh 
 Nagaland – L.P. Singh 
 Odisha – 
 until 30 April: Bhagwat Dayal Sharma
 30 April-30 September: Cheppudira Muthana Poonacha 
 1 October-3 November: S. K. Ray 
 starting 3 November: Cheppudira Muthana Poonacha
 Punjab – Jaisukh Lal Hathi
 Rajasthan – Raghukul Tilak
 Sikkim – B. B. Lal 
 Tamil Nadu – 
 until 26 October: Prabhudas Patwari
 26 October-3 November: M. M. Ismail
 starting 3 November: Sadiq Ali
 Tripura – L. P. Singh 
 Uttar Pradesh – Ganpatrao Devji Tapase (until 27 February), Chandeshwar Prasad Narayan Singh (starting 27 February)
 West Bengal – Tribhuvana Narayana Singh

Events
 National income - 1,470,629 million
 1 January – India asks Soviet Union for troop withdrawal from Afghanistan.
 
 14 January – Indira Gandhi returned to power.
 5 April - Bharatiya Janata Party was formed.
 23 June – Sanjay Gandhi is killed in a plane crash near Safdarjung Airport.
 18 July - SLV-3 successfully launched from Sriharikota.
 Rajiv Gandhi quits working as pilot for Indian Airlines.
 The Bhagalpur Blindings were widely publicized by Indian media.
 31 December – B. P. Mandal, chairman of the Backward Classes Commission, submitted his report to the government.

Law
 25 October - Forest (Conservation) Act

Sport
The Indian Hockey team won the Gold in the Olympics.

Births
21 January  Santhanam, actor and comedian.
10 February – Mohd. Iqbal Khan, actor.
13 March – Varun Gandhi, politician
20 April – Sunaina Sunaina, weightlifter
2 June – Dola Banerjee, archer
4 June  Prashanth Neel, film director. 
20 June – Bobby Darling, actor.
5 July – Zayed Khan, actor.
8 July – Chetan Anand, badminton player.
12 August  Ghibran, music composer. 
14 August – Prabhjot Singh, field hockey player.
16 August – Upen Patel, model and actor.
18 August – Preeti Jhangiani, actress and model.
30 August – Richa Pallod, model and actress.
10 September  Jayam Ravi, actor.
18 September – Akshay Kapoor, actor.
21 September – Kareena Kapoor, actress.
18 October – Reetinder Singh Sodhi, cricketer.
24 October – Laila Mehdin, actress.
12 November – Devesh Chauhan, field hockey player.
13 November – Harman Baweja, actor.
9 December – Gagan Ajit Singh, field hockey player.
11 December – Arya, actor.
17 December – Arjun Halappa, field hockey player.
28 December – Deepak Thakur, field hockey player.

Deaths
23 June – Sanjay Gandhi, politician (b. 1946).
23 June – Varahagiri Venkata Giri, fourth president of India (b. 1894).
18 July – Naoomal Jeoomal, cricketer (b. 1904).
24 July – Uttam Kumar, actor (b. 1926).
31 July – Mohammed Rafi, playback singer (b. 1924).
2 August – Ramkinkar Baij, sculptor and painter (b. 1906)
17 August – Kodavatiganti Kutumbarao, writer (b. 1909).
25 October – Sahir Ludhianvi, Urdu poet and Hindi lyricist and songwriter (b. 1921).
11 November – Chenganoor Raman Pillai, Kathakali artiste (b. 1886).
16 November – Jayan, actor (b. 1938).

References

 
India
Years of the 20th century in India
1980s in India
India